Devers is a city in Liberty County, Texas, United States. The population was 447 at the 2010 census.

Geography

Devers is located at  (30.026379, –94.591642).

Demographics

As of the census of 2000, there were 416 people, 141 households, and 111 families residing in the city. The population density was 222.3 people per square mile (85.9/km2). There were 165 housing units at an average density of 88.2 per square mile (34.1/km2). The racial makeup of the city was 69.47% White, 14.90% African American, 0.24% Native American, 13.94% from other races, and 1.44% from two or more races. Hispanic or Latino of any race were 20.43% of the population.

There were 141 households, out of which 36.9% had children under the age of 18 living with them, 63.8% were married couples living together, 12.8% had a female householder with no husband present, and 20.6% were non-families. 16.3% of all households were made up of individuals, and 8.5% had someone living alone who was 65 years of age or older. The average household size was 2.95 and the average family size was 3.31.

In the city, the population was spread out, with 30.3% under the age of 18, 5.8% from 18 to 24, 28.6% from 25 to 44, 22.8% from 45 to 64, and 12.5% who were 65 years of age or older. The median age was 34 years. For every 100 females, there were 97.2 males. For every 100 females age 18 and over, there were 87.1 males.

The median income for a household in the city was $30,278, and the median income for a family was $31,042. Males had a median income of $30,625 versus $15,208 for females. The per capita income for the city was $14,962. About 23.6% of families and 22.6% of the population were below the poverty line, including 23.5% of those under age 18 and 16.7% of those age 65 or over.

Education
Devers Independent School District serves students in grades pre-kindergarten through eighth. Students in grades nine through twelve attend either Liberty High School in the Liberty Independent School District or Hull-Daisetta High in the Hull-Daisetta Independent School District.

Residents of Devers ISD are zoned to Lee College.

Constructions 
The Liberman Broadcasting Tower Devers and the Clear Channel Broadcasting Tower Devers, guyed TV masts, belong to world's tallest constructions.

References

External links

Cities in Texas
Cities in Liberty County, Texas
Greater Houston